The HTT Pléthore was supposed to be the first Canadian supercar, developed and produced by HTT Automobile in Quebec, Canada. However, the company has been inactive in recent years.

History

It debuted at the 2007 Montreal International Auto Show as a pre-production prototype under the name "Locus Pléthore", under the supervision of Luc Chartrand. This engine is supported by Pratt & Miller and based on the supercharged V8 from the Corvette ZR1. The chassis and body are made entirely out of carbon fibre with no engine subframe, resulting in the chassis being exceptionally rigid. Two prototypes were constructed, the second suggests a center seating position previously featured in the McLaren F1, 1966 Ferrari 365 P prototype, and the 1969 Bizzarrini Manta Concept. HTT Automobile planned to custom build a limited lifetime production run of 99 Pléthores.

Debut

On February 16, 2011, the Pléthore was featured on CBC's Dragon's Den. Sébastien Forest & Carl Descoteaux put forward their pitch for Canada's first supercar, asking $1.5 million for 20% of their company. Subject to completion of due diligence, W. Brett Wilson and Robert Herjavec offered to become partners in the company by purchasing 20% of the company for $1 million, providing an additional $500,000 in loans, and acquiring the rights to purchase 3 Pléthores at cost, including the first car to be sold in Canada. This deal fell through after the transmission failed during a test drive, however an unidentified party stepped in after their television appearance with the necessary funding. HTT planned to make 6-7 cars a year, with 6 cars registered as pre-sold. The HTT Pléthore also made an appearance in the video game Asphalt 8: Airborne.

Resurgence 
In 2013, the HTT Pléthore was revamped to the previous model with an even more powerful engine. HTT called it the LC-1300, for its supposed 1,300 horsepower as a 8.2L V10 taken from the Dodge Viper.

References

Cars of Canada
Sports cars
Motor vehicle manufacturers based in Quebec
Canadian brands
Rear mid-engine, rear-wheel-drive vehicles